Roesy may refer to:
 Roesy (singer)
 ROESY, rotating-frame nuclear Overhauser effect correlation spectroscopy

See also
 Rosey (disambiguation)
 Rosy (disambiguation)